General Radziwiłł may refer to:

Antoni Wilhelm Radziwiłł (1833–1904), Prussian Army General of the Artillery
Antoni Radziwiłł (1775–1833), Prussian Army lieutenant general
Bogusław Fryderyk Radziwiłł (1809–1873), Prussian Army general
Bogusław Radziwiłł (1620–1669), Polish–Lithuanian Commonwealth general
Karol Stanisław Radziwiłł (1734–1790), Polish–Lithuanian Commonwealth general
Michał Gedeon Radziwiłł (1778–1850), general of Polish forces in the November Uprising